Coccothera is a genus of moths belonging to the subfamily Olethreutinae of the family Tortricidae.

Species
Coccothera areata (Meyrick, 1918)
Coccothera carolae Razowski & Trematerra, 2010
Coccothera ferrifracta Diakonoff, 1969
Coccothera pharaonana (Kollar, 1858)
Coccothera spissana (Zeller, 1852)
Coccothera triorbis  Razowski & Trematerra, 2010
Coccothera victrix (Meyrick, 1918)

See also
List of Tortricidae genera

References
De Prins, J. & De Prins, W. 2014. Afromoths, online database of Afrotropical moth species (Lepidoptera). World Wide Web electronic publication (www.afromoths.net) (14.Nov.2014)

External links
tortricidae.com

Tortricidae genera
Olethreutinae
Taxa named by Edward Meyrick